The following is a list of the busiest airports in Peru. The airports are ranked by passenger traffic and aircraft movements. For each airport, the lists cite the city served by the airport, not necessarily the municipality where the airport is physically located.

At a glance

2022

Peru's 15 busiest airports by passenger traffic

2021

Peru's 15 busiest airports by passenger traffic

2020

Peru's 15 busiest airports by passenger traffic

2019

Peru's 15 busiest airports by passenger traffic

2018

Peru's 10 busiest airports by passenger traffic

2017

Peru's 10 busiest airports by passenger traffic

2016

Peru's 10 busiest airports by passenger traffic

2015

Peru's 10 busiest airports by passenger traffic

References

Airports in Peru
 
Pe
Transport in Peru
Aviation in Peru
Aviation in South America